My Way Home or On My Way Home may refer to:

My Way Home (1965 film), a film by Hungarian filmmaker Miklós Jancsó
My Way Home (1978 film), the third in a trilogy of autobiographical films by Scottish filmmaker Bill Douglas
"My Way Home" (Scrubs), the 100th episode of the American situation comedy Scrubs
"On My Way Home" (song), a song by Enya
"My Way Home", a song by Alex Lloyd from Black the Sun
"My Way Home", a song by Jessica Simpson from In This Skin
"My Way Home", a song by Kanye West from Late Registration
"My Way Home", a song by Kirsty MacColl from Electric Landlady
"On My Way Home", a song by Leo O'Kelly from Glare
"On My Way Home", a song by Sophie Barker from Earthbound
"My Way Home", a song by Raffi from The Corner Grocery Store

See also
My Own Way Home, an album by Beth